The Yousuf Dewan Companies (YDC) is a conglomerate company based in Karachi, Pakistan. It is currently owned by the former Sindh Finance Minister Dewan Mohammad Yousuf Farooqui. It is previously known as Dewan Mushtaq Group.

History
The conglomerate was founded in 1912 as Sh Dewan Muhammad Mushtaq.

Companies
The group owns the following companies:

Cement
Dewan Cement Limited
Pakland Cement, 1984

Dewan Karachi Plant established in 1982 having total capacity of 5880 tons/day. Dewan Hattar Plant established in 1995 having total capacity 3780 tons/day. Yousuf Dewan Companies acquired the Pakland Cement Limited, Karachi and Saadi Cement Limited, Hattar on May 17, 2004.
Dewan Hattar Cement Limited merged Dewan Cement Limited on 22-Oct-2007.

Automotive

 Dewan Motors Private Limited 
 Dewan Mushtaq Motor Company (Pvt.) Ltd.
 Dewan Automotive Engineering Limited (defaulter)
Dewan Farooque Motors Limited (defaulter)
 Daehan-Dewan Motor Company (Pvt.) Ltd.

Textile
 Dewan Textile Mills Limited (defaulter)
 Dewan Khalid Textile Mills Limited (defaulter)
 Dewan Mushtaq Textile Mills Limited (defaulter)
 Dewan Farooque Spinning Mills Limited (defaulter)
 Dewan Salman Fibre Limited (defaulter)

Sugar
Dewan Sugar Mills Limited (defaulter)

Educational institutes
The group owns the following educational institutes:
 Shaheed Benazir Bhutto Dewan University

References

External links
 Yousuf Dewan Companies
 Shaheed Benazir Bhutto Dewan University

Conglomerate companies of Pakistan
Conglomerate companies established in 1912
Manufacturing companies based in Karachi
Companies of Sindh